The 2019 Chicago Sky season was the franchise's 14th season in the Women's National Basketball Association (WNBA). The regular season tipped off on May 25 and concluded on September 8. On August 22, the team clinched a playoff berth for the first time in three seasons.

During the offseason, Amber Stocks was dismissed by the team as general manager and head coach. In November, James Wade was announced as the team's new head coach. Wade was previously an assistant with UMMC Ekaterinburg and the Minnesota Lynx.

Three Sky players, all guards, were named as reserves to the 2019 WNBA All-Star Game: veterans Allie Quigley and Courtney Vandersloot, and second-year player Diamond DeShields. The Sky finished the season second in points per game, but second-to-last in points allowed. DeShields was team's leading scorer with 16.2 points per game, and Vandersloot broke her own all-time record with 9.1 assists per game. Vandersloot and DeShields were named to the first and second All-WNBA Teams respectively.

In the first round of the 2019 WNBA Playoffs, fifth-seeded Sky hosted the eighth-seeded Phoenix Mercury, whom they defeated 105–76 in a single-elimination game. They lost their second-round single-elimination game on the road to the Las Vegas Aces by a score of 93–92 in the final seconds.

Transactions

WNBA Draft

The Sky made the following selections in the 2019 WNBA draft:

Trades and Roster Changes

Additions

Subtractions

Roster

Season overview
Prior to the start of the season, new head coach James Wade prioritized improving defense as a key goal for the Sky this season. In the previous season, the Sky had recorded the league's worst defensive rating.

The Sky lost their opening game against the Lynx on May 25, 2019, but won their home opener a week later against the Storm. After a road loss to the Mystics, the Sky proceeded to win four straight games. After a home loss to the Fever, the Sky faced the league-leading Sun, and surprised their opponents with a blowout 93–75 win. With a loss at home to the Mystics on June 26, Chicago held a 6–4 record ten games into the season.

On a three-game road trip from June 28 to July 2, the Sky lost three games against the Storm, Sparks, and Aces, dropping to a 6–7 record. The Sky won 5 out of their next 6 games, however, and improved to an 11–8 record before the All-Star break. The only game they lost during this period was a July 10 home game against the Lynx, which they lost by one point. The stretch also included a one-point win against the Dream on July 17.

Three Sky players—Diamond DeShields, Allie Quigley, and Courtney Vandersloot—were named as reserves in the 2019 WNBA All-Star Game on July 27. Most of the team (all but three players) made the trip to Las Vegas for All-Star Weekend to support their teammates. DeShields won the Skills Challenge during All-Star Weekend, but Quigley failed to repeat as Three-Point Contest champion.

On July 30, on a road trip to face the league-leading Sun, the Sky faced problems with canceled and delayed flights and did not arrive in their hotel until 4:45am on the day of the game. They rebounded with a win in their next road game against the Dream and improved to a 12–9 record.

During a 101–92 comeback victory against the New York Liberty on August 7, the Chicago Sky scored 42 points in the fourth quarter, the highest of any WNBA team since the league moved to a four-quarter format in 2006. Allie Quigley scored 22 points in the game, and Jantel Lavender double-doubled with 20 points and 10 rebounds. With this win, the Sky matched their previous season's win total of 13.

Over their next four games, the Sky faced the two teams directly above them in the standings—the Las Vegas Aces and the Los Angeles Sparks—twice each. They split the series evenly with both teams, achieving a 15–11 record. Their home game against the Aces was marked by officiating controversies and a conflict between Liz Cambage and Cheyenne Parker, which resulted in technical fouls for both players.

In their remaining five games in August, the Sky went 3–2, for an overall record of 18–13. This stretch included both a convincing home 85–78 win over the top-seeded Washington Mystics and a surprise home loss to the low-seeded Dallas Wings. In September, the Sky scored 100 points in two straight games with wins over the playoff-bound Phoenix Mercury and Connecticut Sun, before losing their last regular season game on the road to the Mystics. Finishing the season with a 20–14 record, they finished the season as the fifth-seeded team.

Game log

|- bgcolor="ffcccc"
| 1
| May 14
| Indiana Fever
| L 58–69
| Parker (11)
| Samuelson (7)
| Vandersloot (6)
| Wintrust Arena4,033
| 0–1
|- bgcolor="ffcccc"
| 2
| May 16
| @ Indiana Fever
| L 65–76
| Parker (16)
| Samuelson (6)
| Jackson (5)
| Bankers Life Fieldhouse3,794
| 0–2

Regular season

|- bgcolor="ffcccc"
| 1
| May 25
| @ Minnesota Lynx
| L 71–89
| Tied (11)
| Dolson (7)
| Vandersloot (8)
| Target Center8,524
| 0–1

|- style="background:#bbffbb"
| 2
| June 1
| Seattle Storm
| W 83–79
| Quigley (25)
| Vandersloot (8)
| Vandersloot (11)
| Wintrust Arena7,063
| 1–1
|- bgcolor="ffcccc"
| 3
| June 5
| @ Washington Mystics
| L 85–103
| DeShields (24)
| 4 tied (5)
| Vandersloot (8)
| St. Elizabeth's East Arena2,347
| 1–2
|- style="background:#bbffbb"
| 4
| June 9
| Seattle Storm
| W 78–71
| Parker (18)
| Parker (11)
| Vandersloot (7)
| Wintrust Arena5,032
| 2–2
|- style="background:#bbffbb"
| 5
| June 11
| Phoenix Mercury
| W 82–75
| DeShields (25)
| Parker (10)
| Vandersloot (8)
| Wintrust Arena4,212
| 3–2
|- style="background:#bbffbb"
| 6
| June 15
| @ Indiana Fever
| W 70–64
| Quigley (18)
| Parker (10)
| Vandersloot (8)
| Bankers Life Fieldhouse4,715
| 4–2
|- style="background:#bbffbb"
| 7
| June 19
| @ New York Liberty
| W 91–83
| Vandersloot (25)
| Tied (8)
| Vandersloot (6)
| Westchester County Center1,585
| 5–2
|- bgcolor="ffcccc"
| 8
| June 21
| Indiana Fever
| L 69–76
| DeShields (19)
| Lavender (7)
| Vandersloot (8)
| Wintrust Arena4,945
| 5–3
|- style="background:#bbffbb"
| 9
| June 23
| Connecticut Sun
| W 93–75
| Parker (22)
| Lavender (13)
| Vandersloot (7)
| Wintrust Arena5,607
| 6–3
|- bgcolor="ffcccc"
| 10
| June 26
| Washington Mystics
| L 74–81
| Quigley (21)
| DeShields (9)
| Vandersloot (8)
| Wintrust Arena8,914
| 6–4
|- bgcolor="ffcccc"
| 11
| June 28
| @ Seattle Storm
| L 76–79
| DeShields (19)
| Lavender (10)
| Vandersloot (6)
| Alaska Airlines Arena7,915
| 6–5
|- bgcolor="ffcccc"
| 12
| June 30
| @ Los Angeles Sparks
| L 69–94
| DeShields (23)
| Parker (11)
| Vandersloot (7)
| Staples Center11,067
| 6–6

|- bgcolor="ffcccc"
| 13
| July 2
| @ Las Vegas Aces
| L 82–90
| Quigley (18)
| 3 tied (6)
| Vandersloot (12)
| Mandalay Bay Events Center3,516
| 6–7
|- style="background:#bbffbb"
| 14
| July 7
| Dallas Wings
| W 78–66
| Lavender (20)
| Lavender (10)
| Vandersloot (11)
| Wintrust Arena6,102
| 7–7
|- bgcolor="ffcccc"
| 15
| July 10
| Minnesota Lynx
| L 72–73
| Quigley (24)
| DeShields (9)
| Williams (5)
| Wintrust Arena8,508
| 7–8
|- style="background:#bbffbb"
| 16
| July 12
| New York Liberty
| W 99–83
| Tied (17)
| Dolson (9)
| Vandersloot (12)
| Wintrust Arena7,221
| 8–8
|- style="background:#bbffbb"
| 17
| July 14
| @ Dallas Wings
| W 89–79
| DeShields (26)
| Tied (7)
| Vandersloot (8)
| College Park Center4,261
| 9–8
|- style="background:#bbffbb"
| 18
| July 17
| Atlanta Dream
| W 77–76
| DeShields (22)
| Parker (10)
| Vandersloot (9)
| Wintrust Arena10,143
| 10–8
|- style="background:#bbffbb"
| 29
| July 21
| Indiana Fever
| W 78–70
| Tied (19)
| Lavender (11)
| Vandersloot (14)
| Wintrust Arena6,614
| 11–8
|- bgcolor="ffcccc"
| 20
| July 30
| @ Connecticut Sun
| L 94–100
| Quigley (24)
| Dolson (10)
| Vandersloot (11)
| Mohegan Sun Arena6,358
| 11–9

|- style="background:#bbffbb"
| 21
| August 3
| @ Atlanta Dream
| W 87–75
| Dolson (16)
| DeShields (12)
| Vandersloot (9)
| State Farm Arena5,427
| 12–9
|-
|- style="background:#bbffbb"
| 22
| August 7
| New York Liberty
| W 101–92
| Quigley (22)
| Lavender (10)
| Vandersloot (8)
| Wintrust Arena5,797
| 13–9
|- style="background:#bbffbb"
| 23
| August 9
| @ Las Vegas Aces
| W 87–84
| 3 tied (16)
| DeShields (7)
| Vandersloot (13)
| Mandalay Bay Events Center4,200
| 14–9
|- bgcolor="ffcccc"
| 24
| August 11
| @ Los Angeles Sparks
| L 81–84
| Quigley (20)
| Tied (7)
| Williams (6)
| Staples Center9,244
| 14–10
|- style="background:#bbffbb"
| 25
| August 16
| Los Angeles Sparks
| W 91–81
| Quigley (26)
| Ndour (9)
| Vandersloot (9)
| Wintrust Arena7,907
| 15–10
|- bgcolor="ffcccc"
| 26
| August 18
| Las Vegas Aces
| L 85–100
| DeShields (28)
| Ndour (10)
| Vandersloot (9)
| Wintrust Arena6,072
| 15–11
|- style="background:#bbffbb"
| 27
| August 20
| @Atlanta Dream
| W 87–83
| DeShields (17)
| Ndour (10)
| Vandersloot (10)
| State Farm Arena4,662
| 16–11
|- style="background:#bbffbb"
| 28
| August 23
| Washington Mystics
| W 85–78
| DeShields (22)
| Vandersloot (8)
| Vandersloot (9)
| Wintrust Arena6,131
| 17–11
|- style="background:#bbffbb"
| 29
| August 25
| @ Phoenix Mercury
| W 94–86
| Quigley (24)
| Parker (12)
| Vandersloot (13)
| Talking Stick Resort Arena12,054
| 18–11
|- bgcolor="ffcccc"
| 30
| August 27
| @ Minnesota Lynx
| L 85–93
| Parker (22)
| Parker (8)
| Vandersloot (10)
| Target Center8,092
| 18–12
|- bgcolor="ffcccc"
| 31
| August 29
| Dallas Wings
| L 83–88
| Vandersloot (19)
| Dolson (11)
| Vandersloot (7)
| Wintrust Arena5,614
| 18–13

|- style="background:#bbffbb"
| 32
| September 1
| Phoenix Mercury
| W 105–78
| Tied (18)
| Parker (8)
| Vandersloot (13)
| Wintrust Arena8,845
| 19–13
|- style="background:#bbffbb"
| 33
| September 6
| @ Connecticut Sun
| W 109–104
| DeShields (30)
| Dolson (9)
| Vandersloot (11)
| Mohegan Sun Arena8,077
| 20–13
|- bgcolor="ffcccc"
| 34
| September 8
| @ Washington Mystics
| L 86–100
| DeShields (16)
| Parker (6)
| Vandersloot (6)
| St. Elizabeth's East Arena4,200
| 20–14

Playoffs

|- style="background:#bbffbb"
| 1
| September 11
| Phoenix Mercury
| W 105–76
| DeShields (25)
| Ndour (9)
| Vandersloot (11)
| Wintrust Arena6,042
| 1–0

|- bgcolor="ffcccc"
| 1
| September 15
| Las Vegas Aces
| L 92–93
| DeShields (23)
| Ndour (8)
| Vandersloot (12)
| Thomas & Mack Center7,981
| 0–1

Standings

Playoffs

Statistics

Regular season

Awards and honors

Notes

References 

Chicago Sky seasons
Chicago
Chicago Sky season